C3 Collaborating for Health is a global, not-for-profit non-governmental organisation, based in London, that exists to find solutions to fight the epidemic of non-communicable diseases (NCDs).

The C3 approach 
C3’s focus is on the main risk factors – tobacco use, physical inactivity, and poor diet (including the harmful use of alcohol) – which between them cause the majority of many of the major NCDs – cardiovascular disease (heart disease and stroke), type 2 diabetes, chronic lung disease and cancers.

C3's work 
The United Nations Political Declaration on NCDs (September 2011) calls for a 'whole of society' approach to tackling NCDs. To this end, C3 works with a range of organisations that affect public health and prevention of NCDs, including health professionals and local community leaders, businesses, NGOs, researchers, planners and young people. 
 Health professionals and local communities: Health professionals, local health advocates and researchers are well placed to use their knowledge and evidence to change attitudes and promote health and wellbeing throughout communities.
 Working with businesses: Businesses can develop their core activities to provide a wider range of healthy options for consumers and employee, creating an environment in which it is easier to make healthy choices.
 Workplace health: The workplace offers opportunities to help the working-age population – and, through them, their families and wider communities – to live healthier lives.
Bringing together the many people and organisations that can influence health - e.g. through regular International Breakfast Seminars.
Raising awareness of issues such as the 'early origins of health' (the first 1,000 days of life).

Publications 
C3 has produced a number of reports (e.g. on the benefits of physical activity for health) and also raises awareness of the importance of tackling NCDs and the risk factors through other media, e.g.:
 letters on cycling in The Times and walking in The Economist;
 journal articles, e.g. in Globalization and Health, Nursing Education Today, and the Nursing Standard.

Further information 
C3 was founded in 2009 by Christine Hancock, former general secretary of the Royal College of Nursing and past president of the International Council of Nurses. 
C3 is a registered charity (no. 1135930) and a company limited by guarantee (no. 6941278), registered in England and Wales.

References 

Non-profit organisations based in London